San Pablo District is one of eight districts of the province Canchis in Peru.

Geography 
The most important river of the district is the Willkanuta which crosses the district from southeast to northwest.

The Willkanuta mountain range traverses the district. Some of the highest mountains of the district are listed below:

Ethnic groups 
The people in the district are mainly indigenous citizens of Quechua descent. Quechua is the language which the majority of the population (80.72%) learnt to speak in childhood, 19.02% of the residents started speaking using the Spanish language (2007 Peru Census).

Mayors 
 2012-2014: Fredy Mendigure Quirita.
 2011-2012: Rober Eleuterio Ccoa Aguilar.
 2007-2010: Paulino Ccala Suyo.

References